Union Station was a train station in Portland, Maine.

History 
The building was opened on June 25, 1888, serving trains of the Boston and Maine, Maine Central and Portland and Ogdensburg railroads.  Designed by Boston architects Bradlee, Winslow & Wetherell, it was inspired by the designs of medieval French châteaux. It was a primarily granite building, with a  clock tower. Despite its 'union station' name, the Grand Trunk Railway used a different station two miles away.

The Maine Central ended passenger rail service to the station in September 1960, and it closed on October 30 when the Boston and Maine moved its remaining trains out of the facility. On August 31, 1961, the train station was demolished, and a strip mall built on the property. Nevertheless, the Boston and Maine continued multiple daily trains from Portland itself to Boston until 1965.

Passenger trains
Noteworthy trains into the 1950s and in some cases to 1960:
Boston and Maine:
East Wind (Portland-Washington, DC) (summer only)
State of Maine (Portland-New York City)
Boston and Maine and Maine Central Railroad
Bar Harbor Express (Ellsworth-Washington, DC) (summer only):
Flying Yankee (Bangor-Boston, via Lewiston)
Gull (Halifax-Boston via Lewiston)
Penobscot (Bangor-Boston via Augusta)
Pine Tree (Bangor-Boston via Augusta)
Maine Central Railroad:
unnamed trains to Bangor via Lewiston, to Bangor via Augusta, to Rockland, to Calais via Ellsworth, to Farmington, to Montreal via North Conway

A proposal to relocate Amtrak's Downeaster service from the Portland Transportation Center to a location near Union Station's original location has been endorsed by the Maine Department of Transportation.

References

External links

Transportation in Portland, Maine
Former railway stations in Maine
Portland, Maine
Stations along Boston and Maine Railroad lines
Maine Central Railroad stations
Portland, Maine
Railway stations in the United States opened in 1888
Transportation buildings and structures in Cumberland County, Maine